Air to Air Simulations Inc. (A2A) is a privately held American company which is headquartered in Simsbury, Connecticut, United States that specializes in the development and publishing of flight simulations, strategy games, visual effects, and sound. The company was founded in 2003 and was previously known as Shockwave Productions Inc.

Air to Air Simulations has established itself as a leading producer of flight simulation products and is particularly renowned for its proprietary "Merlin Air Combat Engine". This game engine powers the company's popular 2005 release, Battle of Britain II: Wings of Victory.

The company's dedication to creating high-quality, realistic simulations has earned it a loyal following among gamers and aviation enthusiasts alike. With a focus on accuracy and attention to detail, Air to Air Simulations has become a trusted name in the industry.

History
Air to Air Simulations Inc. is a privately held American company that specializes in the development and publishing of flight simulations, strategy games, visual effects, and sound. The company was originally founded in 2003 under the name Shockwave Productions Inc. On May 14, 2008, the company underwent a rebranding and changed its name to Air to Air Simulations Inc. (A2A). 

According to statements made by A2A Simulations Inc., the decision to change the company's name from Shockwave Productions to Air to Air Simulations Inc. (A2A) in 2008 was driven by reports of customer confusion between the two brands, compounded by the popularity of a similarly named online gaming website known as Shockwave. 

In 2019, A2A Simulations made an announcement regarding a significant development in their partnership with Airtech Simulation and Laminar Research, the developer of the X-Plane software.

Games
Combat Flight Simulator 3: Firepower (2004)
Wings of Power: WWII Heavy Bombers and Jets (2004)
Battle of Britain II: Wings of Victory (2005)
Wings of Power II: WWII Fighters (2006)
Microsoft Flight Simulator X: Steam Edition add-ons (2015-19)

References

External links
 
 A2A Simulations at MobyGames

2003 establishments in Connecticut
American companies established in 2003
Video game companies established in 2003
Companies based in Hartford County, Connecticut
Simsbury, Connecticut
Video game development companies
Video game companies of the United States